Robert Francis "Jitterbug" Kellogg (August 4, 1917 – May 9, 1985) was an American football halfback. 

A native of Wynne, Arkansas, he attended Louisiana-Monroe and Tulane. He led the 1939 Tulane Green Wave football team to an undefeated regular season and a Southeastern Conference championship. He played professional football in the National Football League (NFL) for the Chicago Cardinals during the 1940 season. He played in the 1940 College All Star game where he rushed for two touchdowns and passed for another.  He also played for the Jersey City Giants for seven games in 1940.

During World War II, Kellogg served in the U.S. Navy. He later worked as a coach for four college football programs (Tulane, Wake Forest, Texas Tech, and Mississippi State) and three Canadian Football League teams (Edmonton, Regina, and Regina). He was the backfield coach at Edmonton from 1960 to 1962.  He died in 1985 in Columbus, Mississippi.

References

1917 births
1985 deaths
Chicago Cardinals players
Tulane Green Wave football players
Players of American football from Arkansas
American football halfbacks
People from Wynne, Arkansas
Louisiana–Monroe Warhawks football players